Simples may refer to:

 Simple (philosophy), in contemporary mereology, any thing that has no proper parts
 Simples, term for medicinal herbs in some herbals
 "Simples!", catchphrase in the Compare the Meerkat advertising campaign

See also
Simple